Lynette Ruth Breuer  (born 28 March 1951) is a former Australian politician who represented the electoral district of Giles in the South Australian House of Assembly for the Labor Party from 1997 to 2014. Breuer became Speaker of the South Australian House of Assembly for the Mike Rann and Jay Weatherill Labor governments following the 2010 election. Breuer was the first female Speaker of the South Australian House of Assembly from 2010 to 2013.

Before entering Parliament at the 1997 election, Breuer was a lecturer in Women's Studies and Vocational Education at the Spencer Institute of TAFE. She was Junior Vice President of the Australian Labor Party.

Breuer did not re-contest her seat at the 2014 election.

She was elected as mayor of the City of Whyalla in August 2016.

In May 2017 Breuer was found guilty of a breach of the Council's code of conduct over a "heated argument" with another council member and a third person who had complained.

In January 2018 it was announced that Breuer was under investigation for the alleged assault of the wife of SA-Best 2018 state elections candidate Tom Antonio, at a 2017 Remembrance Day function. She was defeated by Clare McLaughlin at the November 2018 elections.

See also
Women and government in Australia
Women in the South Australian House of Assembly

References

http://www.abc.net.au/news/2018-02-01/whyalla-mayor-steps-down-from-council-after-alleged-assault/9383810

External links

 

Members of the South Australian House of Assembly
1952 births
Living people
Australian Labor Party members of the Parliament of South Australia
Speakers of the South Australian House of Assembly
21st-century Australian politicians
21st-century Australian women politicians
Women members of the South Australian House of Assembly